Solosuchiapa is a town and one of the 119 Municipalities of Chiapas, in southern Mexico.

As of 2010, the municipality had a total population of 8,065, up from 7,784 as of 2005. It covers an area of 362.7 km2.

As of 2010, the town of Solosuchiapa had a population of 2,035. Other than the town of Solosuchiapa, the municipality had 67 localities, none of which had a population over 1,000.

References

Municipalities of Chiapas